Baháʼí literature covers a variety of topics and forms, including scripture and inspiration, interpretation, history and biography, introduction and study materials, and apologia. Sometimes considerable overlap between these forms can be observed in a particular text.

The "canonical texts" are the writings of the Báb, Baháʼu'lláh, ʻAbdu'l-Bahá, Shoghi Effendi and the Universal House of Justice, and the authenticated talks of ʻAbdu'l-Bahá. The writings of the Báb and Baháʼu'lláh are regarded as divine revelation, the writings and talks of ʻAbdu'l-Bahá and the writings of Shoghi Effendi as authoritative interpretation, and those of the Universal House of Justice as authoritative legislation and elucidation. Some measure of divine guidance is assumed for all of these texts.

The Baháʼí Faith relies extensively on its literature. Literacy is strongly encouraged so that believers may read the texts for themselves. In addition, doctrinal questions are routinely addressed by returning to primary works.

Many of the religion's early works took the form of letters to individuals or communities. These are termed tablets and have been collected into various folios by Baháʼís over time. Today, the Universal House of Justice still uses letters as a primary method of communication.

Literary forms
Generally speaking, the literary form of a particular book can generally be observed by noting the author and/or title.

Scripture, inspiration and interpretation

Baháʼís believe that the founders of the religion, The Báb and Baháʼu'lláh, received revelation directly from God. As such their works are considered divinely inspired. These works are considered to be "revealed text" or revelation.

ʻAbdu'l-Bahá was appointed by Baháʼu'lláh to be his successor and was authorized by him to interpret the religion's "revealed text." The works of ʻAbdu'l-Bahá are therefore considered authoritative directives and interpretation, as well as part of Baháʼí scripture. He, along with The Báb and Baháʼu'lláh, is considered one of the "Central Figures" of the religion.

Likewise Shoghi Effendi's interpretations and directives are considered authoritative, but are not considered to expand upon the "revealed text", or to be scripture.

In the Baháʼí view, the Universal House of Justice does not have the position to interpret the founders' works, nor those of ʻAbdu'l-Bahá or Shoghi Effendi. However, it is charged with addressing any question not addressed in those works. As such its directives are considered authoritative, as long as they are in force (the Universal House of Justice may alter or revoke its own earlier decisions as needed), and are often collected into compilations or folios.

The works of the Central Figures, Shoghi Effendi, and the Universal House of Justice taken together are the canonical texts of the Baha'i Faith.

A special category of works consist of the prayers of the Central Figures. These were often included in original letters and have been collected into various prayer books. Baháʼu'lláh's Prayers and Meditations is a significant volume. As Baháʼís are to pray, meditate, and study sacred scripture daily, these books are common.

History and biography
Shoghi Effendi's only book, God Passes By, is a central text covering the history of the faith from 1844 to 1944. Nabil-Zarandi's Dawn Breakers covers the Bábí period extensively through to Baháʼu'lláh's banishment from Persia in 1853.

Ruhiyyih Rabbani's Ministry of the Custodians details the interregnum between Shoghi Effendi's death in 1957 and the election of the Universal House of Justice in 1963.

Other authors have revisited the early periods of the religion in the Middle East or addressed historical periods in other places. Some of these contain significant amounts of biographical data and can be considered biographies. Notably, Balyuzi's and Taherzadeh's works have focused on the history and biographies of the central figures of the religion and their significant contemporaries.

Introduction and study materials
One of the earliest introductory texts available in English is Esslemont's Baháʼu'lláh and the New Era. This book, originally published in 1923, has undergone several revisions over time to update, correct, and clarify its contents though ʻAbdu'l-Bahá was able to personally review several of its chapters. More than sixty years later, it remains in the top ten of cited Baháʼí books.

Several other introductory texts are available. Hatcher & Martin's The Baháʼí Faith: The Emerging Global Religion, Momen's A Short Introduction to the Baháʼí Faith, and Smith's The Baháʼí Religion are some examples.

Of considerable importance to the Baháʼí community worldwide is the Ruhi series of study materials inspired, and largely produced, by the Baháʼí community of Colombia. These books form the core texts used in "Study Circles" and "Training Institutes" by Baháʼí communities around the world.

Apologia
A few of Baháʼu'lláh's works may classify as apologia. In addition to being significant doctrinal works, his Kitáb-i-Íqán (Book of Certitude) and Epistle to the Son of the Wolf address both Islamic and Baháʼí audiences.

During Baháʼu'lláh's lifetime, both Nabíl-i-Akbar and Mírzá Abu'l-Faḍl Gulpáygání were noteworthy Shiʻa scholars who accepted the religion. Nabíl-i-Akbar was well versed in, and wrote on Shiʻa issues. Mírzá Abu'l-Faḍl wrote extensively on both Christian and Shiʻa apologia, most notably in his book The Brilliant Proof.

While Townshend's Christ and Baháʼu'lláh may also be regarded as an apologetic response to Christian concerns, Udo Schaefer, et al.'s Making the Crooked Straight is a decidedly apologetic response to Ficicchia's polemical Der Baháʼísmus - Religion der Zukunft? (Baháʼísm – Religion of the future?), a book which was published and promoted by the Evangelische Zentralstrelle für Weltanschauungsfragen (Central Office of the Protestant Church for Questions of Ideology) in the 1980s. This organization has since revoked its affiliation with Ficicchia and now recognizes the Baháʼí Faith as an important partner in inter-religious dialogue.

Revelation

Baháʼu'lláh occasionally would write himself, but normally the revelation was dictated to his secretaries, whose tracts are sometimes recorded it in what has been called revelation writing, a shorthand script written with extreme speed owing to the rapidity of the utterance being transcribed. Afterwards, Baháʼu'lláh revised and approved these drafts. These revelation drafts and many other transcriptions of the writings of Baháʼu'lláh's, some of which are in his own handwriting, are kept in the International Baháʼí Archives in Haifa, Israel.

Some large works, for example the Kitáb-i-Íqán, were revealed in a very short time, as in a night, or a few days.

Volume
Baháʼu'lláh wrote many books, tablets and prayers, of which only a fraction have so far been translated into English. He revealed thousands of tablets with a total volume more than 70 times the size of the Qurʼan and more than 15 times the size of the Bible. Over 7000 tablets and other works have been collected of an estimated 15,000 texts. Considering the great scope and volume of Baháʼu'lláh's writings which Bahá'ís possess, it is interesting Baháʼu'lláh's amanuensis Mírzá Áqá Ján reported that on numerous occasions (especially while in Baghdad) Baháʼu'lláh expressly ordered that hundreds of thousands of his recorded verses be "obliterated and cast into the river" as Baháʼu'lláh felt people at that time were not yet ready for them. Though a small percentage of Bahá'u'lláh's original writings have been translated into English, those completed include many of his most important works.

Language
Most Baháʼí literature, including all the writings of Baháʼu'lláh, was originally written in either Persian or Arabic. English translations use the characteristic Baháʼí orthography developed by Shoghi Effendi to render the original names. His work was not just that of a translator, as he was also the designated interpreter of the writings, and his translations are used as a standard for current translations of the Baháʼí writings.

A style guide, available at the bahai.org website, gives a glossary and pronunciation guide of names and concepts as used within the Baháʼí Faith, including,
 Baháʼí Faith, pronounced as: Ba-HIGH
 Baháʼu'lláh, pronounced as: Ba-ha-ul-LAH
 Báb, pronounced as: Bahb (Bob)
 ʻAbdu'l-Bahá, pronounced as: Abdul ba-HAH
 Baháʼí Naw-Rúz, pronounced as: Naw Rooz
 Ridván, pronounced as: REZ-vahn

Authenticity and authority
The question of the authenticity of given texts is of great concern to Baháʼís. As noted, they attach considerable importance to the writings of those they consider to be authoritative figures. The primary duty of the Research Department of the Universal House of Justice and the International Baháʼí Library is the collection, cataloguing, authentication, and translation of these texts.

By way of comparison, "pilgrims' notes" are items or sayings that are attributed to the central figures but have not been authenticated. While these may be inspirational, they are not considered authoritative. Some of ʻAbdu'l-Bahá's collected talks (e.g. ʻAbdu'l-Bahá in London, Paris Talks, and The Promulgation of Universal Peace.) may fall into this category, but are awaiting further authentication. The Star of the West, published in the United States from 1910 to 1924, contains many pilgrim's notes and unauthenticated letters of ʻAbdu'l-Bahá.

There is no Baháʼí corollary to Islamic Hadith; in fact, Baháʼís do not consider Hadith authoritative.

The Baháʼí community seeks to expand the body of authenticated and translated texts. The 1992 publication of the English translation of Baháʼu'lláh's The Kitáb-i-Aqdas, and the more recent Gems of Divine Mysteries (2002), The Summons of the Lord of Hosts (2002), and The Tabernacle of Unity (2006) are significant additions to the body of work available.

At the same time there is concerted effort to re-translate, edit, and even redact works that are not authenticated. For example, ʻAbdu'l-Bahá on Divine Philosophy, published in 1916, was not reprinted at the direction of Shoghi Effendi. Also, early editions of Esslemont's Baháʼu'lláh and the New Era contained several passages that could not be authenticated, or were incorrect. These have been reviewed and updated in subsequent editions. This practice has been criticized by observers, but is considered an integral part of maintaining the integrity of the texts.

Bábí texts are proving very difficult to authenticate, despite the collection of a variety of documents by E.G. Browne in the late 19th and early 20th centuries. Browne's principal correspondents were Azalis, whom he considered to be the genuine followers of the Báb. Compounding the difficulties of collecting reliable manuscripts at such a distance – Browne was at Cambridge – was the widespread Azali practice of taqiyya (dissimulation), or concealing one's beliefs. Browne appears to have been unaware of this. Azali taqiyya rendered many early Bábí documents unreliable afterwards, as Azali Bábís would often alter and falsify Bábí teachings and history.

In contrast, dissimulation was condemned by Baháʼu'lláh and was gradually abandoned by the early Baháʼís.

Select bibliography

The list below is incomplete. William P. Collins, in his Bibliography of English-language Works on the Bábí and Baháʼí Faiths, 1844–1985, gives a list of 2,819 items, which includes multiple editions.

For ease of browsing, the bibliography is sub-divided by author.

Authoritative

ʻAbdu'l-Bahá

 ʻAbdu'l-Bahá (2021). Light of the World: Selected Tablets of 'Abdu'l-Bahá.

Many of the above are collections but there are estimated to be over 15,000 texts archived, and over 30,000 possibly written in total.

Báb
Arabic Bayán
Persian Bayán

Baháʼu'lláh

 Fire Tablet
 Long Healing Prayer
 Tablet of Ahmad (Arabic)
 Tablet of the Holy Mariner
Over 7000 tablets and other works have been collected of an estimated 15,000 texts. However, only a relative few have been translated and catalogued.

Central Figures: prayer books

Central Figures and Shoghi Effendi: compilations
The Universal House of Justice has prepared several compilations of extracts from the Central Figures and Shoghi Effendi.

Shoghi Effendi

Universal House of Justice and its agencies
These are original works of the Universal House of Justice and its agencies as distinct from compilations.

Other authors

Mírzá Abu'l-Faḍl Gulpáygání

Balyuzi, H.M.

Bahíyyih Khánum

Esslemont, J.E.

Nabíl-i-Zarandí

Rabbani, Rúhíyyih

Taherzadeh, Adib

Periodicals

News
The Baháʼí World (published since 1925 in various places), some volumes digitized online at bahaiworld.bahai.org (official website), bahai.works and at bahai-library.com, as well as some maps and charts.
Star of the West, (published March 1910 to March 1935 in the United States), digitized online at several places including bahai.works, starofthewest.info, bahai-library.com
Titled Bahai  News for Volume 1 (March 1910 to March 1911), Star of the West for Volumes 2–21 (March 1911 to March 1931), then The Baháʼí Magazine thereafter (Volumes 22–25) 
Initially published in Chicago by the Baháʼí News Service, under the auspices of the Canada-United States Executive Committee for the Baháʼí Temple Unity, later published in Washington, D.C. by the National Spiritual Assembly of the United States and Canada.
Baháʼí News (published Dec. 1924 to Oct. 1990 in the United States), digitized online at bahai.works, bahai-news.info, bahai-library.com
The American Baháʼí (published since 1970 in the United States)
Herald of the South (published since 1925 in New Zealand and Australia) 
 Australian Baháʼí Report (published at least 1999–2006) in Australia, some issues of which were digitized and are archived online at archive.org

See also

 Baháʼí Faith in fiction

Notes

Citations

References

Further reading

External links
These sites focus on Baháʼí texts and related documents:
Baháʼí Reference Library Searchable online editions of Baháʼí sacred texts in English, Arabic, and Persian. Sponsored by the Baháʼí International Community.
Baháʼí eBooks Publications Publishers of Baháʼí books for electronic devices. Sponsored privately.
The Bábí and Baháʼí Religions: An Annotated Bibliography An extensive bibliography of Bábí and Baháʼí related books, articles, and letters. Sponsored privately.
Baháʼí Library Online An extensive online library of Bábí and Baháʼí related books, articles, and letters. Sponsored privately.
Baháʼí Prayers Online index of, and links to, prayers sorted by topic. Sponsored privately.
Statements Library Searchable online editions of statements of the Baháʼí International Community. Sponsored by the Baháʼí International Community.
International Baháʼí Library, Haifa (archived)
H-Bahai Discussion Network Babí & Baháʼí texts and studies in English, Arabic, and Persian. Some texts not authenticated and provisional translations. Sponsored privately.
Windows to the Past Deepening talks (MP3 and transcriptions).

These sites contain online or downloadable searchable databases of collected world religious works. English and French language versions contain extensive Baháʼí, Buddhist, Christian, Hindu, Islamic, Jewish, and other religious texts. Large libraries of Baháʼí texts are available in other, generally European, languages:
Bahairesearch.com Online. Sponsored privately. Includes several European and Japanese language Baháʼí texts.
Ocean Downloadable. Sponsored privately.
Holy Writings, online version of Ocean content. Sponsored privately.